Mount Cardinall is a conical mountain,  high, lying close southwest of Mount Taylor and overlooking the northeast head of Duse Bay, at the northeast end of the Antarctic Peninsula. It was probably first seen by a party under J. Gunnar Andersson of the Swedish Antarctic Expedition, 1901–04. It was charted in 1945 by the Falkland Islands Dependencies Survey, who named it for Sir Allan Cardinall, then Governor of the Falkland Islands.

Map
 Trinity Peninsula. Scale 1:250000 topographic map No. 5697. Institut für Angewandte Geodäsie and British Antarctic Survey, 1996.

References
 

Mountains of Trinity Peninsula